Obsessed is an American documentary series that began airing on the A&E Network on May 29, 2009. The series depicts the real-life struggle and treatment of people with anxiety disorders, including obsessive-compulsive disorder, panic disorder, social anxiety disorder, and general anxiety disorder.

Robert Sharenow of A&E has said about the show "The series sheds a light on the vast world of anxiety disorders, while offering those who suffer from these debilitating afflictions a path to recovery..."

Critical reaction

Variety's online review of the show is mixed. It refers to the first half of the show as "providing a kind of voyeuristic carnival element" but later on in the review states that the producers make the show "mostly about the pain and loneliness of such disorders; it's not strictly a freak show".

Website PopMatters' review of the show concludes with saying the show "falls short" which "has to do both with the complexity of these conditions and its own limited, conventional means of conveying subjective states. "

Format

The first portion of each episode is dedicated to showing how each subject is affected by their disorder. The second portion of each episode shows the subjects undergoing cognitive behavioral therapy to treat their disorder.

Episode list

Season 1

Season 2

References

External links
 
 
 Futon Critic interview with executive producer Troy Searer
 Casting for A&E's Obsessed

2009 American television series debuts
2000s American reality television series
2010 American television series endings
2010s American reality television series
A&E (TV network) original programming
2000s American documentary television series
2010s American documentary television series
Anxiety disorders
English-language television shows
Television about mental health